Peak Eight is a summit in Del Norte County, California, sacred to the Yurok, Karok and Tolowa tribes.

References

Mountains of Del Norte County, California
Mountains of Northern California
Religious places of the indigenous peoples of North America